Ceroxylon is a genus of flowering plants in the family Arecaceae, native to the Andes in Venezuela, Colombia, Ecuador, Peru, and Bolivia, known as Andean wax palms.

Description
Ceroxylon palms develop single, smooth, wax-covered, often whitish cylindrical trunks encircled by ringed leafbase scars. Ceroxylon species are dioecious (the individual plant produces flowers of only one sex). Leaves are pinnate. Inflorescences emerge from among, and often project conspicuously beyond, the leaves. Round fruits, up to one inch in diameter, are red or orange at maturity. Many Ceroxylon species are endangered by habitat destruction.

Two species of Andean wax palms, C. quindiuense and C. alpinum, provide nesting sites and food for a species of Colombian parrot now in danger of extinction, Ognorhynchus icterotis.

Uses
In Colombia, Ceroxylon palms are frequently harvested for their wood. Ceroxylon palm leaves are also used in Palm Sunday ceremonies.

Cultivation
Several Ceroxylon species, including C. quindiuense, C. alpinum, C. vogelianum, C. ventricosum, and C. parvifrons, are cultivated as ornamental trees outside their native range in cool, humid, mild climates with minimal frosts, such as parts of Australia, coastal California, Hawai'i, New Zealand, South Africa, and coastal Western Europe. The Jose Celestino Mutis Botanical Garden in Bogotá, Colombia, contains an extensive planting of Ceroxylon palms. Other public gardens where cultivated Ceroxylon spp. can be viewed include the San Francisco Botanical Garden in Golden Gate Park, San Francisco, California, the Huntington Botanical Gardens, in Pasadena (near Los Angeles), California, and the Oakland Palmetum at the Lakeside Garden Center in Oakland, California.

Species
The genus contains the following species:

References

External links

 
Flora of the Andes
Arecaceae genera
Garden plants of South America
Ornamental trees
Taxa named by Aimé Bonpland
Taxonomy articles created by Polbot
Dioecious plants